Neese is a surname. Notable people with the surname include:

Brian Neese (born 1964), American professional strongman competitor
Charles Gelbert Neese (1916–1989), American judge
Terry Neese, American businesswoman and political candidate
Tim Neese, American politician

See also
Meanings of minor planet names: 9001–10000#211